Papa Ibrahima Ba (born 19 May 1946) is a Senegalese athlete. He competed in the men's long jump at the 1976 Summer Olympics.

References

1946 births
Living people
Athletes (track and field) at the 1976 Summer Olympics
Senegalese male long jumpers
Olympic athletes of Senegal
Place of birth missing (living people)